Bartow may refer to:

Places
 Bartow, Germany, a municipality in Mecklenburg-Vorpommern
 Places in the United States, all named after Francis S. Bartow:
Bartow, Florida, a city and county seat
Bartow, Georgia, a town
Bartow County, Georgia
Bartow, West Virginia, a census-designated place

People
 Bartow (name), a surname and given name

Other uses
 Bartow Arena, Birmingham, Alabama, United States, home to the teams of the University of Alabama at Birmingham
 Bartow Air Base, a former United States Air Force base near Bartow, Florida
 Bartow High School, Bartow, Florida

See also
Barlow (disambiguation)
Barstow (disambiguation)